Ezham Rathri is a 1982 Indian Malayalam-language thriller film, directed by Krishnakumar. The film stars Kamal Haasan in lead role. The film has musical score by Ilaiyaraaja. It was dubbed into Tamil language as Ezhavathu Iravil.

Cast 
 Kamal Haasan
 Nagesh
 Karan
 Jyothi Lakshmi
 Subhashini
 Rajeshwari

References

External links 
 

1982 films
1980s Malayalam-language films
Indian thriller films
1982 thriller films